Yevgeniya Dmitrievna Timofeeva (23 December 1911  13 June 1992) was a pilot in the Soviet Air Force and the first woman to fly the Pe-2. As a member of the 587th Bomber Aviation Regiment, later redesignated as the 125th Guards Bomber Aviation Regiment named after Marina Raskova, she initially served as a squadron commander but was later promoted to deputy regimental commander during the war. By the end of the war she totaled 45 sorties on the Pe-2.

Awards
 Two Order of the Red Banner (1943 and 1945)
 Two Order of the Patriotic War (1st class - 1943; 2nd class - 1985)
 campaign and jubilee medals

References

Bibliography 
 

1911 births
1992 deaths
Recipients of the Order of the Red Banner
Soviet World War II pilots
Women military aviators
Soviet World War II bomber pilots